Preston Muslim Girls High School is a secondary school located in the Deepdale area of Preston in the English county of Lancashire.

It was founded in 1989 as a private Islamic school for girls. In 2011 it became a voluntary aided school and part of the state-funded sector administered by Preston City Council.

Preston Muslim Girls High School GCSEs and BTECs as programmes of study for pupils. Girls at the school also have the option to take part in the Duke of Edinburgh's Award programme.

References

External links
Preston Muslim Girls High School official website

Secondary schools in Lancashire
Girls' schools in Lancashire
Islamic schools in England
Educational institutions established in 1989
1989 establishments in England
Schools in Preston
Voluntary aided schools in England